Oceanic Bank International, commonly referred to as Oceanic Bank, was a bank in Nigeria that provided individual, commercial and corporate banking services.

History
Oceanic Bank was incorporated on March 26, 1990, as a private limited liability company with 100% equity ownership by Nigerian citizens, and licensed on April 10, 1990, to carry on commercial banking. The bank commenced business on June 12, 1990, at the Waterfront Plaza, Plot 270, Ozumba Mbadiwe Avenue, Victoria Island, Lagos. It was listed on the Nigerian Stock Exchange on June 25, 2004. In October 2010, Cecilia Ibru, the former head of Oceanic Bank, was sentenced to eighteen months and ordered to forfeit over US$1 billion for fraud.

Following the sentencing of Mrs Ibru after she pleaded guilty to three-count charge bordering on negligence, reckless grant of credit facilities and mismanagement of depositors’ funds, the Bank was put into administration and subsequently acquired in 2011 by a rival bank, Ecobank. In June 2014, Mrs Ibru files a motion at the Abuja Federal High Court asking the court to reverse the acquisition of Oceanic Bank.

Global presence
As of May 2009, Oceanic Bank had subsidiaries in the following countries:

  Cameroon
  Gambia - This subsidiary was closed in January 2011.
  Ghana
  Nigeria
  São Tomé and Príncipe - Sold to Global Fleet Group in May 2011.

Subsidiaries
The bank has the following subsidiary companies:

 Oceanic Registrars Limited - Lagos, Nigeria
 Oceanic Trustees Limited - Lagos, Nigeria
 Oceanic Custodian Limited - Lagos, Nigeria
 Oceanic Insurance Limited - Lagos, Nigeria
 Oceanic Homes Limited - Lagos, Nigeria
 Oceanic Securities Limited - Lagos, Nigeria
 Oceanic Asset Management Limited - Lagos, Nigeria

References

External links
 Oceanic Bank Official Website
 Oceanic Bank at Google Finance
 Oceanic Bank at Alacrastore
 Oceanic Bank International at Nigerian Stock Exchange

Companies listed on the Nigerian Stock Exchange
Banks of Nigeria
Banks established in 1990
Nigerian companies established in 1990